Phytotechnology implements solutions to scientific and engineering problems in the form of plants. It is distinct from ecotechnology and biotechnology as these fields encompass the use and study of ecosystems and living beings, respectively. Current study of this field has mostly been directed into contaminate removal (phytoremediation), storage (phytosequestration) and accumulation (see hyperaccumulators). Plant-based technologies have become alternatives to traditional cleanup procedures because of their low capital costs, high success rates, low maintenance requirements, end-use value, and aesthetic nature.

Overview
Phytotechnology is the application of plants to engineering and science problems. Phytotechnology uses ecosystem services to provide for a specifically engineered solution to a problem. Ecosystem services, broadly defined fall into four broad categories: provisioning (i.e. production of food and water), regulating (i.e. the control of climate and disease) supporting (i.e. nutrient  cycles and crop pollination), and cultural (i.e. spiritual and recreational benefits). Many times only one of these ecosystem services is maximized in the design of the space. For instance a constructed wetland may attempt to maximize the cooling properties of the system to treat water from a wastewater treatment facility before introduction to a river. The designed benefit is a reduction of water temperature for the river system while the constructed wetland itself provides habitat and food for wildlife as well as walking trails for recreation. Most phytotechnology has been focused on the abilities of plants to remove pollutants from the environment. Other technologies such as green roofs, green walls and bioswales are generally considered phytotechnology. Taking a broad view: even parks and landscaping could be viewed as phytotechnology.

However, there is very little consensus over a definition of phytotechnology even within the field. The Phytotechnology Technical and Regulatory Guidance and Decision Trees, Revised defines phytotechnology as, "Phytotechnologies are a set of technologies using plants to remediate or contain contaminants in soil, groundwater, surface water, or sediments." The United Nations Environment Programme defines phytotechnology as, "the application of science and engineering to study problems and provide solutions involving plants." A third definition from the Department of Environmental Engineering Indonesia, gives it as, "a technology which is based on the application of plants as solar driven and living technology for improving environmental sanitation and conservation problems."

Rationale for use
In phytotechnology the naturally existing properties of plants are used to accomplish defined outcomes with ecosystem services in a designed environment. The phytotechnologic system uses these properties, broadly the degradation/use of chemicals in the environment and the transport and storage of water, to change the output of the system. These mechanisms have evolved since the beginning of angiosperms 1000 mya and have become quite effective. The diversity of plants also gives versatility to the phytotechnologic system. Plants from the native environment capable to handle many applications and non-natives for more specific projects (such as hyperaccumulators for heavy metal removal). Ancillary benefits are a factor. Community use,  education use, tax credits, habitat creation, increased sustainability and aesthetics are all benefits of phytotechnology.

The cost of the system is also lower compared to traditional remediation technologies in many cases. Without pumping systems, electricity costs, infrastructure and other costs. Even if the initial investment is higher in some cases (notably green roofs) the costs over the lifetime of the project will be less.

Cautions against use
Plants will not tolerate certain conditions. Too much pollution, water, salt or other variables can kill the plants in the system. Water solubility of the pollutants affects the system. Plants also have mechanisms to halt the uptake of substances and may not remove a contaminate completely in an acceptable time frame. The length of time in which the project must be completed is another  limiting factor. Many phytotechnologies take at least two years or longer to reach maturity and some could be designed as legacy projects, with lifespans which may be 100 years or more. In more temperate climates the systems may become inactive or much less active in the winter months and may not be usable at all in more arctic environments.

Mechanisms of action
There are many physiological properties of plants which can be used in phytotechnology. The mechanisms work synergistically to achieve the goals set by a project.

Phytosequestration
Phytosequestration is the ability of plants to sequester certain contaminants in root zone. This is accomplished through several of the plant's physiological mechanisms. Phytochemicals extruded in the root zone can immobilize or precipitation of the target contaminant. The transport proteins associated with the root also can irreversibly bind and stabilize target contaminants. Contaminants can also be taken up by the root and sequestered in the vacuoles in the root system.

Phytohydraulics
Phytohydraulics is the ability of plants to capture, transport and transpire water from the environment. This action in turn contains pollutants and controls the hydrology of the environment. This mechanism does not degrade the contaminant.

Rhizodegradation
Rhizodgradation is the enhancement of microbial degradation of contaminants in the rhizosphere. The presence of a contaminant in the soil will naturally provide an environment for bacteria and fungi which can use the containment as a source of energy. The root systems of plants, in most cases, will form a symbiotic relationship with the organisms in the soil. The oxygen and water transported by the roots allows for greater growth of beneficial soil microorganisms. This allows for greater breakdown of the contaminant and quicker remediation. This is the primary means through which organic contaminants can be remediated.

Rhizofiltration

Rhizofiltration is the adsorption onto plant roots or absorption into plant roots of contaminants that are in solution surrounding the root zone.

Phytoextraction

Phytoextraction is the ability to take contaminants into the plant. The plant material is then removed and safely stored or destroyed.

Phytovolatilization
Phytovolatilization is the ability to take up contaminants in the transpiration stream and then transpire volatile contaminants. The contaminant is remediation by removal through plants.

Phytodegradation
Phytodegradation is the ability of plants to take up and degrade the contaminants. Contaminants are degraded through internal enzymatic activity and photosynthetic oxidation/reduction.

References
United Nations. United Nations Environment Programme. Phytotechnologies: A Technical Approach in Environmental Management. 2003. Web. <http://wedocs.unep.org/bitstream/handle/20.500.11822/9159/fito.pdf?sequence=1&isAllowed=y>.
ITRC (Interstate Technology & Regulatory Council). 2009. Phytotechnology Technical and Regulatory Guidance and Decision Trees, Revised. PHYTO-3. Washington, D.C.: Interstate Technology & Regulatory Council, Phytotechnologies Team, Tech Reg Update. www.itrcweb.org
Trihadiningrum, Y., H. Basri, M. Mukhlisin, D. Listiyanawati, and N.A. Jalil. "Phytotechnology, a Nature Based Approach for Sustainable Sanitation and Conservation." Water Environment Partnership Asia. WEPA, n.d. Web. 26 Oct 2011. <http://www.wepa-db.net/pdf/0810forum/presentation07.pdf>.

Biotechnology